Nowruleh may refer to:
 Nowruleh-ye Olya
 Nowruleh-ye Sofla